The 2012–13 Montenegrin First Handball League was seventh season of the Montenegrin First League of Men's Handball, Montenegro's premier handball league.

Participants

The league regularly consists of eight teams, but in the season 2012/13 there was seven participants. In the second part of season, four best clubs participated in the TOP4 league for champion, and the last three played in relegation league.

The following seven clubs participated in the Montenegrin First League 2012/13.

First part

During the first part of the season, all members played 12 games. Four best placed teams - Lovćen, Mojkovac, Budvanska rivijera and Sutjeska continued season in the TOP4 league for champion. Other teams were playing league for relegation.

Table of the first part of the season:

TOP4 / relegation league

At the final phase, RK Lovćen Cetinje defended their champions' title from the last season. Lovćen became second team ever to finish a season without losing a point. (the first team to do it was Budućnost in the season 2009/10)
In the relegation league, most success have RK Ulcinj, which survived in the First league. Other two clubs were relegated to the Second league.

TOP4 League

Relegation League

Summary

 Promotion to the EHF Cup 2013/14: Lovćen Cetinje
 Promotion to the SEHA League 2013/14: Lovćen Cetinje
 Relegation to the Second League 2013/14: Mornar Bar, Berane
 Promotion to the First league 2013/14: Boka Tivat, Danilovgrad

Handball leagues in Montenegro
Hand
Hand
Monte